My Lady Jane is an upcoming British television series made for Amazon Prime Video starring Emily Bader, Edward Bluemel and Jordan Peters. Produced by MacDonald & Parkes the television series is adapted by Gemma Burgess from a series of novels that provided a historical reimagining of the life of Lady Jane Grey, written by Brodi Ashton, Cynthia Hand and Jodi Meadows, that began with My Lady Jane in 2016.

Synopsis
In the 16th century Lady Jane Grey avoids the executioner's axe and has a fun and fulfilling life, full of romance and adventure.

Cast
 Emily Bader as Lady Jane Grey
 Edward Bluemel as Lord Guildford Dudley
 Jordan Peters as King Edward
 Anna Chancellor as Lady Frances Grey
 Rob Brydon as Lord Dudley
 Dominic Cooper as Lord Seymour
 Jim Broadbent as Duke of Leicester
 Will Keen as Duke of Norfolk
 Kate O'Flynn
 Máiréad Tyers
 Isabella Brownson
 Henry Ashton
 Abbie Hern
 Joe Klocek
 Brandon Grace
 Michael Workeye

Production
The series is based on the historical young adult novels by Brodi Ashton, Cynthia Hand and Jodi Meadows. Production company Parkes & MacDonald are producing the series with Gemma Burgess and Meredith Glynn as co-showrunner and executive producers, and Jamie Babbit directing the pilot and executive producer, whilst Sarah Bradshaw and Laurie MacDonald are executive producers. Eight episodes were ordered for season one of the series. In November 2022 Anna Chancellor, Rob Brydon, Dominic Cooper and Jim Broadbent were announced to have supporting roles as aristocrats.

Filming took place in the UK in 2022 ahead of a projected late 2023 release. One filming location was reported to be Great Chalfield Manor near Bath, England. Filming was also reported in and around Dover Castle in Kent.

Broadcast
The series is expected to stream on
Amazon Prime Video in late 2023.

References

External links

2023 British television series debuts
2023 British television series endings
2020s British drama television series
2020s British television miniseries
Upcoming television series
Amazon Prime Video original programming
English-language television shows
Television shows filmed in England
Television shows shot in Kent
Cultural depictions of Lord Guildford Dudley
Cultural depictions of Lady Jane Grey
Television set in Tudor England
Cultural depictions of Edward VI of England
Television series set in the 16th century